1919 in sports describes the year's events in world sport. Although World War I had ended in 1918, the influenza pandemic and planning difficulties from the war still curtailed sport to a considerable extent.

American football
 Green Bay Packers established at Green Bay, Wisconsin
 Decatur Staleys established at Decatur, Illinois; the club will relocate to Chicago in 1921 and rename itself Chicago Bears
 New York Pro Football League holds what is believed to be the first ever playoff tournament, won by the Buffalo Prospects
 Canton Bulldogs win Ohio League title and the de facto national championship
 Most professional teams reactivate after suspending operations the year before

Association football
England
 Competitive football resumes after the end of World War I in the 1919–20 season
 The First Division is expanded from 20 to 22 teams; Chelsea is spared relegation, while Arsenal controversially win promotion from the Second Division, despite only finishing fifth in 1915, at the expense of rivals Tottenham Hotspur. Derby County and Preston North End are also promoted.
 The Second Division is expanded from 20 teams to 22, bringing the total number of League clubs to 44. Glossop is expelled from the league and five clubs are elected. Stoke FC is restored to the league while Coventry City, South Shields (membership until 1930), Rotherham United and West Ham United all join the league for the first time.
 Leeds City is expelled from the Football League due to financial irregularities after the 1919–20 season has begun; Port Vale is elected as a late entrant and takes over Leeds City's playing record to date.
France
 Formation of the French Football Federation (Fédération Française de Football or FFF)
Germany
 National Championship – suspended during World War I
Poland
 Formation of the Polish Football Association (Polski Związek Piłki Nożnej or PZPN)
Spain
 Valencia CF was founded in Spain, on March 18

Australian rules football
VFL Premiership
 Collingwood wins the 23rd VFL Premiership, defeating Richmond 11.12 (78) to 7.11 (53) at Melbourne Cricket Ground (MCG) in the 1919 VFL Grand Final.
South Australian Football League
 3 May: SAFL league football resumes after three seasons of “patriotic competitions” due to World War I.
 27 September: Sturt and North Adelaide draw 5.9 (39) apiece in the 1919 SAFL Grand Final.
 4 October: In a low-scoring replay, Sturt 3.5 (23) defeat North Adelaide 2.6 (18) to win their second SAFL premiership.
West Australian Football League
 20 September: East Perth 10.8 (68) defeat East Fremantle 7.4 (46) to win their first WAFL premiership.

Bandy
Sweden
 Championship final – IFK Uppsala 8–2 IF Göta

Baseball
World Series
 Cincinnati Reds (NL) defeats Chicago White Sox (AL) to win the 1919 World Series by 5 games to 3
Events
 Even before game one of this World Series, there are rumours that some White Sox players have agreed to throw the series to the Reds for payment from gamblers. This will explode a year later in the Black Sox Scandal.
 Babe Ruth hits 29 home runs for the Boston Red Sox, breaking the single season record of 27 set by Ned Williamson in 1884
Minor leagues
 The Florida State League is founded with teams in Bartow, Bradenton, Lakeland, Orlando, Sandford and Tampa
 The Intercounty Baseball League is formed in Ontario, Canada with teams in Stratford, Guelph, Kitchener and Galt

Boxing
Events
 4 July — Jack Dempsey becomes World Heavyweight Champion by knocking out Jess Willard, the defending champion, in four rounds. Dempsey becomes one of the greatest-ever boxing champions, his charisma and punching power enabling promoters to stage the first "million dollar gates".
 Jack Britton regains the World Welterweight Championship from Ted "Kid" Lewis for the second time, this time retaining it until his defeat by Mickey Walker in 1922.
Lineal world champions
 World Heavyweight Championship – Jess Willard → Jack Dempsey
 World Light Heavyweight Championship – Battling Levinsky
 World Middleweight Championship – Mike O'Dowd
 World Welterweight Championship – Ted "Kid" Lewis → Jack Britton
 World Lightweight Championship – Benny Leonard
 World Featherweight Championship – Johnny Kilbane
 World Bantamweight Championship – Pete Herman
 World Flyweight Championship – Jimmy Wilde

Canadian football
Grey Cup
 not contested

Cricket
Events
 Very few first-class matches are played worldwide during the 1918–19 season but the County Championship is reintroduced in the 1919 English season to progress the game's post-war recovery.
England
 County Championship – Yorkshire
 Minor Counties Championship – not contested
 Most runs – Jack Hobbs 2594 @ 60.32 (HS 205*)
 Most wickets – Wilfred Rhodes 164 @ 14.42 (BB 8–44)
 Wisden Cricketers of the Year – Andy Ducat, Patsy Hendren, Percy Holmes, Herbert Sutcliffe, Ernest Tyldesley
Australia
 Sheffield Shield – not contested
 Most runs – Warwick Armstrong 249 @ 83.00 (HS 162*)
 Most wickets – Ted McDonald 25 @ 15.72 (BB 8–42)
India
 Bombay Quadrangular – Europeans
New Zealand
 Plunket Shield – Wellington (Dec 1918 to Jan 1919) and Canterbury (from Jan 1919)
South Africa
 18 October – With the end of World War I, first-class cricket is played in South Africa for the first time since 13 April 1914. However, the interprovincial Currie Cup does not resume until 1920–21.
West Indies
 Inter-Colonial Tournament – not contested

Cycling
Tour de France
 Firmin Lambot (Belgium) wins the 13th Tour de France
Giro d'Italia
 Costante Girardengo

Figure skating
World Figure Skating Championships
 The championships are not contested

Golf
Major tournaments
 British Open – not contested due to World War I
 US Open – Walter Hagen
 USPGA Championship – Jim Barnes
Other tournaments
 British Amateur – not contested due to World War I
 US Amateur – Davidson Herron

Horse racing
Events
 Sir Barton is the first horse to win the United States Triple Crown
England
 Grand National – Poethlyn
 1,000 Guineas Stakes – Roseway
 2,000 Guineas Stakes – The Panther
 The Derby – Grand Parade
 The Oaks – Bayuda
 St. Leger Stakes – Keysoe
Australia
 Melbourne Cup – Artilleryman
Canada
 King's Plate – Ladder of Light
Ireland
 Irish Grand National – not contested
 Irish Derby Stakes – Loch Lomond
USA
 Kentucky Derby – Sir Barton
 Preakness Stakes – Sir Barton
 Belmont Stakes – Sir Barton

Ice hockey
Stanley Cup
 Montreal Canadiens and Seattle Metropolitans win two games each in the 1919 Stanley Cup Finals before the series, held at Seattle, is cancelled after all of the Montreal players contract Spanish flu
Events
 March 6 - Montreal Canadiens defeat Ottawa Senators in a best-of-seven series to win the National Hockey League championship.
 March 14 - Seattle Metropolitans defeat Vancouver Millionaires in a two-game playoff to win the 1919 PCHA season title.
 Allan Cup – Hamilton Tigers OHA)
 1919 Memorial Cup - University of Toronto Schools wins the inaugural Memorial Cup for the Canadian national junior championship

Motorsport

Multi-sport events
Far Eastern Championship Games
 Fourth Far Eastern Championship Games held in Manila, Philippine Islands

Rowing
The Boat Race
 Oxford and Cambridge Boat Race – not contested due to World War I

Rugby league
England
 It is not possible to resume national competitions in the 1918–19 season but county leagues and cups are arranged.
 Lancashire League Championship – Rochdale Hornets
 Yorkshire League Championship – Hull
 Lancashire County Cup – Rochdale Hornets 22–0 Oldham
 Yorkshire County Cup – Huddersfield 14–8 Dewsbury
Australia
 NSW Premiership – Balmain (outright winner)

Rugby union
Five Nations Championship
 Five Nations Championship series is not contested due to World War I.
 An Inter-Services Championship is held in Great Britain between Allied Forces rugby teams. The tournament is won by the New Zealand Army team.

Speed skating
Speed Skating World Championships
 not contested due to World War I

Tennis
Australia
 Australian Men's Singles Championship – Algernon Kingscote (GB) defeats Eric Pockley (Australia) 6–4 6–0 6–3
England
 Wimbledon Men's Singles Championship – Gerald Patterson (Australia) defeats Norman Brookes (Australia) 6–3 7–5 6–2
 Wimbledon Women's Singles Championship – Suzanne Lenglen (France) defeats Dorothea Douglass Lambert Chambers (GB) 10–8 4–6 9–7
France
 French Men's Singles Championship – not contested due to World War I
 French Women's Singles Championship – not contested due to World War I
USA
 American Men's Singles Championship – Bill Johnston (USA) defeats Bill Tilden (USA) 6–4 6–4 6–3
 American Women's Singles Championship – Hazel Hotchkiss Wightman (USA) defeats Marion Zinderstein (USA) 6–1 6–2
Davis Cup
 1919 International Lawn Tennis Challenge –  4–1  at Double Bay Grounds (grass) Sydney, Australia

References

 
Sports by year